Petar Grgec (January 27, 1933 - August 2, 2006) was a Croatian Naïve Artist, born in Kloštar Podravski in the region of Podravina, Kingdom of Yugoslavia which is in present-day Croatia.

Grgec graduated from the Civil Engineering Polytechnic in Pula in 1952. In 1953 he first exhibited his works at the Engineers Corps Art Section Show in Karlovac where he came on his military service and settled. Since 1958 he had been an active painter producing oils on glass, canvas, watercolours and drawings. He had over 30 solo exhibitions and took part in over 300 group shows in Croatia and abroad. He was a member and co-founder of the association of Croatian Naïve Artists and a member of the Roman Academy I 500. His works are in the Henri Rousseau Museum in Laval, Museum of Contemporary Religious Art in The Vatican, Metropolitan Museum in Manila, Art Museum in Sao Paulo, Croatian Museum of Naive Art in Zagreb and elsewhere around the world. He lived and worked in Karlovac.

Sources
The Miracle Of Croatian Naïve Art by Ratko Vince, Josip Depolo, Ivan Rogič Nehajev (Zagreb 1996)

See also
 Naïve Art

1933 births
2006 deaths
People from Kloštar Podravski
Croatian naïve painters
Burials at Mirogoj Cemetery
20th-century Croatian painters
Croatian male painters
21st-century Croatian painters
21st-century male artists
20th-century Croatian male artists